Survival of the Fittest is a professional wrestling tournament held by Ring of Honor (ROH). The inaugural tournament took place in 2004, and - with exceptions (2008, 2013, 2019–2020) - has become an annual tradition in ROH ever since.

Format
Wrestlers compete in a variety of "qualifying" matches, usually either singles matches or tag team matches, with the winner(s) of each match advancing to an elimination match where the last remaining competitor would be deemed the Survival of the Fittest winner, and receive a future ROH World Championship match.

History
The tournament setup is based on Maryland Championship Wrestling's Shane Shamrock Memorial Cup, as ROH was to continue the Shane Shamrock Memorial Cup following the shutdown of MCW in 2003.  However, following a controversy with ROH's owner in early 2004, MCW dropped their association with Ring of Honor, and ROH renamed the already scheduled tournament "Survival of the Fittest".

In 2019, it was announced the event would take place on November 9 and 10, but the shows were ultimately cancelled.

List of winners
2004 – Bryan Danielson
2005 – Roderick Strong
2006 – Delirious
2007 – Chris Hero
2009 – Tyler Black
2010 – Eddie Edwards
2011 – Michael Elgin
2012 – Jay Lethal
2014 – Adam Cole
2015 – Michael Elgin (2)
2016 – Bobby Fish
2017 – Punishment Martinez
2018 – Marty Scurll
2021 – Bandido

Championship match for winner
 – Championship victory
 – Championship match loss

Tournament results

2004
ROH's first Survival of the Fittest tournament took place on June 24, 2004 in Philadelphia, Pennsylvania.
Qualifying match: Mark Briscoe defeated Alex Shelley to advance
Qualifying match: Colt Cabana defeated Trent Acid to advance
Qualifying match: Generation Next (Austin Aries and Roderick Strong) defeated John Walters and Josh Daniels
This match was originally scheduled to be a singles match between Walters and Aries, but was changed to a tag team match after Generation Next attacked Walters.
As a result of scoring the victory, Aries advances to the finals.
Qualifying match: Homicide defeated Jay Briscoe to advance
Qualifying match: Bryan Danielson defeated Jack Evans to advance
Qualifying match: Samoa Joe defeated Matt Stryker to advance
Final match: Bryan Danielson defeated Austin Aries, Colt Cabana, Homicide, Mark Briscoe and Samoa Joe in a Six-Way Elimination match to win Survival of the Fittest
Samoa Joe was eliminated by Colt Cabana
Colt Cabana was eliminated by Mark Briscoe
Mark Briscoe and Homicide eliminated each other by double pinfall
Austin Aries was eliminated by Bryan Danielson

2005
ROH's second Survival of the Fittest tournament took place on September 24, 2005 in Boston, Massachusetts.
Qualifying match: Jay Lethal defeated Sal Rinauro to advance
Qualifying match: Colt Cabana defeated Ricky Reyes to advance
Qualifying match: Austin Aries defeated Jimmy Rave by disqualification to advance
Qualifying match: Samoa Joe defeated Milano Collection A.T. to advance
Qualifying match: Roderick Strong defeated Jerrelle Clark to advance
Qualifying match: Christopher Daniels defeated James Gibson to advance
Final match:Roderick Strong defeated Austin Aries, Christopher Daniels, Colt Cabana, Jay Lethal and Samoa Joe in a Six-Way Elimination match to win Survival of the Fittest.
Samoa Joe was eliminated by Roderick Strong
Christopher Daniels was eliminated by Austin Aries
Jay Lethal was eliminated by Roderick Strong
Colt Cabana was eliminated by Roderick Strong
Austin Aries was eliminated by Roderick Strong

2006
ROH's third Survival of the Fittest tournament took place on October 6, 2006 in Cleveland, Ohio.
Qualifying match: Matt Sydal defeated Davey Richards to advance
Qualifying match: Delirious defeated Jimmy Rave to advance
Qualifying match: Austin Aries defeated Christopher Daniels to advance
Qualifying match: The Briscoe Brothers (Jay and Mark) defeated Homicide and Roderick Strong to advance
Qualifying match: Bryan Danielson vs. Samoa Joe ended in a 20-minute time limit draw
As a result of a draw, neither wrestler advances
Final match: Delirious defeated Austin Aries, Jay Briscoe, Mark Briscoe and Matt Sydal in a Five-Way Elimination match to win Survival of the Fittest.
Austin Aries was eliminated by Jay Briscoe
Jay Briscoe was eliminated by Matt Sydal
Mark Briscoe was eliminated by Matt Sydal
Matt Sydal was eliminated by Delirious

2007
ROH's fourth Survival of the Fittest tournament took place on October 19, 2007 in Las Vegas, Nevada.
Qualifying match: Roderick Strong defeated Brent Albright to advance
Qualifying match: Chris Hero defeated Karl Anderson to advance
Qualifying match: Rocky Romero defeated T. J. Perkins to advance
Qualifying match: Austin Aries defeated Delirious to advance
Qualifying match: Claudio Castagnoli defeated Davey Richards to advance
Qualifying match: Bryan Danielson vs. Nigel McGuinness ended in a 20-minute time limit draw
As a result of a draw, neither wrestler advances.
Qualifying match: Human Tornado defeated Shane Hagadorn and Tony Kozina
This was originally scheduled as a non-tournament match, but turned into one as a result of Bryan Danielson and Nigel McGuinness wrestling to a draw.
Survival of the Fittest: Chris Hero defeated Austin Aries, Claudio Castagnoli, Human Tornado, Rocky Romero and Roderick Strong in a Six-Way Elimination match to win Survival of the Fittest.
Human Tornado was eliminated by Chris Hero
Rocky Romero was eliminated by Chris Hero
Austin Aries was eliminated by Chris Hero
Roderick Strong was eliminated by Chris Hero
Claudio Castagnoli was eliminated by Chris Hero

2009
ROH's fifth Survival of the Fittest tournament took place on October 10, 2009 in Indianapolis, Indiana.
Due to his performance in an ROH World Championship match the night before, ROH Executive Producer Jim Cornette gave Delirious a bye into the finals of the tournament.
Qualifying match: Roderick Strong defeated Rhett Titus to advance
Qualifying match: Tyler Black defeated Kenny King to advance
Qualifying match: Colt Cabana defeated Kevin Steen to advance
Qualifying match: Claudio Castagnoli defeated Petey Williams to advance
Qualifying match: Chris Hero defeated Kenny Omega to advance
Final match: Tyler Black defeated Chris Hero, Colt Cabana, Claudio Castagnoli, Delirious and Roderick Strong in a Six-Way Elimination match to win Survival of the Fittest.
Claudio Castagnoli was eliminated by Colt Cabana
Colt Cabana was eliminated by Delirious
Delirious was eliminated by Roderick Strong
Chris Hero was eliminated by Tyler Black
Roderick Strong was eliminated by Tyler Black

2010
ROH's sixth Survival of the Fittest tournament took place on November 12, 2010 in Dearborn, Michigan.
Qualifying match: Rhett Titus defeated Colt Cabana to advance
Qualifying match: Claudio Castagnoli defeated Grizzly Redwood to advance
Qualifying match: Kevin Steen defeated Kyle O'Reilly to advance
Qualifying match: Adam Cole defeated Steve Corino to advance
Qualifying match: Eddie Edwards defeated Chris Hero to advance
Qualifying match: Kenny King defeated El Generico to advance
Final match: Eddie Edwards defeated Adam Cole, Claudio Castagnoli, Kenny King, Kevin Steen and Rhett Titus in a Six-Way Elimination match to win Survival of the Fittest
Kevin Steen was eliminated by Claudio Castagnoli
Adam Cole was eliminated by Claudio Castagnoli
Rhett Titus was eliminated by Claudio Castagnoli
Claudio Castagnoli was eliminated by Kenny King
Kenny King was eliminated by Eddie Edwards

2011
ROH's seventh Survival of the Fittest tournament took place on November 18, 2011 at the Montgomery County Fairgrounds in Dayton, Ohio.
Qualifying match: The Briscoe Brothers (Jay and Mark) defeated The Bravado Brothers (Lancelot and Harlem) to advance
Qualifying match: Kyle O'Reilly defeated Andy Ridge to advance
Qualifying match: Eddie Edwards defeated Mike Bennett to advance
Qualifying match: Michael Elgin defeated Adam Cole, Kenny King and Tommaso Ciampa in a Four Corner Survival match to advance
Qualifying match: Roderick Strong defeated Rhett Titus to advance
Final match: Michael Elgin defeated Eddie Edwards, Jay Briscoe, Kyle O'Reilly, Mark Briscoe and Roderick Strong in a Six-Way Elimination match to win Survival of the Fittest
Jay Briscoe was eliminated by Eddie Edwards
Mark Briscoe was eliminated by Eddie Edwards
Roderick Strong was eliminated by Eddie Edwards
Eddie Edwards was eliminated by Michael Elgin
Kyle O'Reilly was eliminated by Michael Elgin

2012
ROH's eighth Survival of the Fittest tournament took place on September 22, 2012 at the Du Burns Arena in Baltimore, Maryland.  The tournament was recorded in a single day for Ring of Honor's television show, and aired on a taped delay over the span of several weeks.
Qualifying match: Adam Cole defeated TaDarius Thomas to advance
Qualifying match: Davey Richards defeated Mike Bennett to advance
Qualifying match: Jay Lethal defeated QT Marshall to advance
Qualifying match: Roderick Strong defeated Homicide to advance
Qualifying match: Mike Mondo defeated Kyle O'Reilly to advance
Qualifying match: Michael Elgin defeated Rhino to advance
Final match: Jay Lethal defeated Adam Cole, Davey Richards, Michael Elgin, Mike Mondo and Roderick Strong in a Six-Way Elimination match to win Survival of the Fittest
Mike Mondo was eliminated by Roderick Strong
Roderick Strong was eliminated by Adam Cole
Adam Cole was eliminated by Michael Elgin
Michael Elgin was eliminated by Davey Richards and Jay Lethal
Davey Richards was eliminated by Jay Lethal

2014
ROH's ninth Survival of the Fittest tournament took place on November 8, 2014 at the Seagate Convention Center in Toledo, Ohio. The tournament took place over a span of 2 days.
Qualifying match: Tommaso Ciampa defeated Will Ferrara to advance
Qualifying match: Roderick Strong defeated TaDarius Thomas to advance
Qualifying match: Adam Page defeated Cedric Alexander to advance
Qualifying match: Adam Cole defeated Delirious to advance
Qualifying match: Hanson defeated Jay Lethal to advance
Qualifying match: Matt Sydal defeated A. C. H. to advance
Final match: Adam Cole defeated Adam Page, Hanson, Matt Sydal, Roderick Strong, and Tommaso Ciampa in a Six-Way Elimination match to win Survival of the Fittest
Roderick Strong was eliminated by Adam Page
Adam Page was eliminated by Matt Sydal
Matt Sydal was eliminated by Tommaso Ciampa
Tommaso Ciampa was eliminated by Adam Cole
Hanson was eliminated by Adam Cole

2015

2016

2017

2018

2021
ROH announced the tournament would return in 2021, taking place throughout the month of June on ROH's flagship TV program Ring of Honor Wrestling, and their online show ROH Week by Week.

There were 12 participants competing in six qualifying matches, with the winners advancing to a six-way elimination finals (aired June 26 on Ring of Honor Wrestling) where the winner received an ROH World Championship match at Best in the World.

Participants:
Rey Horus
Flamita
Bandido
Bateman
Dak Draper
Eli Isom
Brian Johnson
Sledge
Rhett Titus
Danhausen
O'Shay Edwards
Chris Dickinson

Qualifying matches:
June 5 Ring of Honor Wrestling - Flamita defeated Rey Horus
June 8 ROH Week by Week - Brian Johnson defeated Sledge
June 12 Ring of Honor Wrestling - Eli Isom defeated Dak Draper
June 15 ROH Week by Week - Chris Dickinson defeated  O'Shay Edwards
June 19 Ring of Honor Wrestling - Bandido defeated Bateman
June 22 ROH Week by Week - Rhett Titus defeated Danhausen

Finals:
June 26 Ring of Honor Wrestling - Bandido wins by last eliminating Eli Isom
Order of Elimination:
Bandido pinned Flamita
Rhett Titus pinned Brian Johnson
Chris Dickinson defeated Titus by submission
Bandido pinned Dickinson
Bandido defeated Eli Isom by submission to win the tournament

See also
ROH World Tag Team Championship
ROH World Television Championship
ROH Pure Championship

References

External links
ROHwrestling.com (Official website)